Down Under is a 1975 Australian play by Bob Ellis and Anne Brooksbank.

The original production had a cast that included Carmen Duncan and Bill Hunter. The Sydney Morning Herald critic said "this may be the best and bitchiest play since Don's Party."

Towards the end of the play's run at the Nimrod, Ellis and Brooksbank brought the theatre. Ellis later said they bought it when Down Under was "under threat of eviction".

References

External links

1975 plays
Australian plays